The North Staffordshire Railway (NSR) H Class was a class of 0-6-0 steam locomotive designed by John H. Adams, third son of William Adams. They were designed to replace  aging 0-6-0 locomotives on NSR long distance goods and coal trains both on and off the NR network thanks to the NSR's extensive running powers. Four were built in December 1909 all at the company's Stoke railway works. The whole class was withdrawn by the beginning of 1930, owing to the small nature of the class. This small class was supplemented by an additional modified four, designated H1 class.

The only modification to the class during LMS days was regarding the safety valves, the original Ramsbottom ones being replaced by Ross-pop type. 

The livery of the H Class was the NSR's Madder Lake with straw lining, and NORTH STAFFORD lettering on the tender along with the company crest. The number appeared on the cabside. In LMS days they received the standard plain black freight livery with large numerals on the tender. They were renumbered twice in LMS ownership; once, upon grouping, in the 23xx series, and again in 1928 to make way for the LMS Fowler 2-6-4T being built at the time, to Nos. 8681 to 8684.

List of Locomotives

References

North Staffordshire Railway
0-6-0 locomotives
Railway locomotives introduced in 1909
Standard gauge steam locomotives of Great Britain
Scrapped locomotives